Qashqa Qeshlaq-e Hajj Akbar (also Romanized as Qāshqā Qeshlāq-e Ḩājj Akbar) is a village in Qeshlaq-e Jonubi Rural District, Qeshlaq Dasht District, Bileh Savar County, Ardabil Province, Iran. At the 2006 census, its population was 23, in 5 families.

References 

Towns and villages in Bileh Savar County